National Biscuit Company Building may refer to:

National Biscuit Company Building (Los Angeles, California), Los Angeles Historic-Cultural Monument
National Biscuit Company Building (Des Moines, Iowa), listed on the National Register of Historic Places in Polk County, Iowa
National Biscuit Company Building (Houston, Texas), listed on the National Register of Historic Places in Harris County, Texas